The 2008 United States presidential election in North Dakota took place on November 4, 2008, and was part of the 2008 United States presidential election. Voters chose three representatives, or electors to the Electoral College, who voted for president and vice president.

North Dakota was won by Republican nominee John McCain by an 8.7% margin of victory. Prior to the election, most news organizations considered this a state McCain would narrowly win, or otherwise considered to be a red state. In the final weeks of the race, some news organizations considered the race a toss-up. The state has not been won by a Democratic presidential nominee since Lyndon B. Johnson in 1964. Polls showed McCain and Democrat Barack Obama running unusually close in a state that gave George W. Bush a 27.4% margin of victory over John Kerry in 2004. In the end, McCain kept North Dakota in the GOP column but by a much smaller margin than Bush's landslide in 2004.

This is the last time a Democratic presidential candidate won at least 40% of the vote in North Dakota, and the last time North Dakota voted to the left of Alaska, Mississippi, Louisiana and Texas. It is also the last of only two elections since its statehood in which the winner of Indiana won none of North Dakota's electoral votes.

Caucuses
 2008 North Dakota Democratic presidential caucuses
 2008 North Dakota Republican presidential caucuses

Campaign

Predictions
There were 16 news organizations who made state-by-state predictions of the election. Here are their last predictions before election day:

Polling

Pre-election polls showed a complete toss up. The final 3 polls averaged gave Obama leading 45% to 44%, leaving a lot of undecided voters.

Fundraising
John McCain raised a total of $184,405 in the state. Barack Obama raised $191,551.

Advertising and visits
Obama and his interest groups spent $448,361. McCain and his interest groups spent $71,972. Obama visited the state once, in Fargo, North Dakota, while the Republican ticket didn't visit the state once.

Analysis
North Dakota has been considered a reliably red state for the past 40 years, having voted for the Republican presidential nominee of every election since 1968. In 2008, however, polls taken before September surprisingly showed the two candidates running neck-to-neck. While the polls varied throughout the campaign, McCain's selection of the socially conservative Governor Sarah Palin of Alaska as his vice presidential running mate played well in North Dakota, a state that has the lowest percentage of nonreligious citizens in the country. After Palin joined the ticket in late August, McCain then took a double digit lead in the state until October, when polling once again showed a close race between the two candidates in the Peace Garden State.

On Election Day 2008, however, McCain captured North Dakota by a fairly safe margin of approximately 8.65 points, despite the latest polling showing him just one point ahead of Obama. Still, the statewide result was significantly closer than in 2004 when Bush carried the state by a much larger margin of more than 27%. McCain did well throughout the western and central parts of the state, while Obama won the two majority Native American counties of Rolette (which has not voted Republican since Dwight D. Eisenhower in 1952) in the north and Sioux in the south by more than three-to-one. More significantly, Obama carried several normally Republican counties in the east including the most populous counties of Cass County (which contains the state's largest city of Fargo) and Grand Forks County (which includes the college town of Grand Forks). In these two largest counties in the state, Obama was the first Democratic victor since Lyndon Johnson in 1964, while in rock-ribbed Republican McIntosh County, Obama’s 37.79 percent constitutes the best performance by a Democrat since Franklin D. Roosevelt in 1936.

At the same time, popular incumbent Republican Governor John Hoeven was reelected to a second term in a landslide three-to-one victory over Democrat Tim Mathern and Independent DuWayne Hendrickson. Hoeven received 74.44% of the vote while Mathern took in 23.53% and Hendrickson with the remaining 2.03%. Democrats, however, made gains at the state level, picking up three seats in the North Dakota House of Representatives and six seats in the North Dakota Senate.

, this is the last election in which Cass County, Grand Forks County, Mountrail County, Towner County, Traill County, Nelson County, and Eddy County voted for a Democratic presidential candidate. This is also the last time in which Cass County gave a majority to a candidate of any party.

Results

Results by county

By congressional district
Due to the state's low population, only one congressional district is allocated. This district is called the At-Large district, because it covers the entire state, and thus is equivalent to the statewide election results.

Counties that flipped from Republican to Democratic
 Cass (largest city: Fargo)
 Eddy (largest city: New Rockford)
 Grand Forks (largest city: Grand Forks)
 Mountrail (largest city: Stanley)
 Nelson (largest city: Lakota)
 Ransom (largest city: Lisbon)
 Sargent (largest city: Gwinner)
 Towner (largest city: Cando)
 Traill (largest city: Mayville)

Electors

Technically the voters of North Dakota cast their ballots for electors: representatives to the Electoral College. North Dakota is allocated 3 electors because it has 1 congressional districts and 2 senators. All candidates who appear on the ballot or qualify to receive write-in votes must submit a list of 3 electors, who pledge to vote for their candidate and his or her running mate. Whoever wins the majority of votes in the state is awarded all 3 electoral votes. Their chosen electors then vote for president and vice president. Although electors are pledged to their candidate and running mate, they are not obligated to vote for them. An elector who votes for someone other than his or her candidate is known as a faithless elector.

The electors of each state and the District of Columbia met on December 15, 2008, to cast their votes for president and vice president. The Electoral College itself never meets as one body. Instead the electors from each state and the District of Columbia met in their respective capitols.

The following were the members of the Electoral College from the state. All 3 pledged to John McCain and Sarah Palin:
Theresa Tokach - replaced Richard Elkin
Susan Wefald
Leon Helland

See also
 United States presidential elections in North Dakota
 Presidency of Barack Obama

Notes

References

North Dakota
2008
2008 North Dakota elections